Isis Holt (born 3 July 2001) is an Australian Paralympic athlete competing in T35 sprint events. She is affected by the condition cerebral palsy. Holt won gold medals in the 100 m and 200 m at the 2015 and 2017 World Para Athletics Championships. At the 2016 Rio Paralympics, she won two silver medals and a bronze medal and 2020 Tokyo Paralympics, two silver medals .

Personal life
Holt was born on 3 July 2001 with cerebral palsy, which affects both sides of her body. She attended at Brunswick Secondary College. She previously attended Melbourne Girls Grammar.

Athletics
Holt took up athletics in 2014. At the 2015 IPC Athletics World Championships in Doha in her first major overseas competition, she won gold medals in world record time in two events: Women's 100m T35 (13.63 (w: +2.0) world record) and the Women's 200m T35 (28.57 (w: +1.5 world record). At the IPC Athletics Grand Prix in Canberra on 7 February 2016, she smashed her 200m T35 world record by running 28.38 (w: +0.2). At the 2016 Australian Athletics Championships in Sydney, she broke world records in winning the 100m and 200m Ambulant events.

At the 2016 Rio Paralympics, she won silver medals in the Women's 100 m T35 and Women's 200 m T25 and a bronze medal in the Women's 4 × 100 m Relay T35-38.

At the 2017 World Para Athletics Championships in London she won gold medals in the Women's 100 m T35 and Women's 200 m T35. In winning the 100 m she broke the world record with a time of 13.43. This time broke the world record she previously held by 0.14 seconds By winning the 100 m and 200 m Holt defended titles won at the 2015 World Championships. Two weeks prior to leaving for the World Championships she was hospitalised with tonsillitis.

After the Rio Paralympics, Holt moved to Queensland to be coached by Paul Pearce. At the 2018 Commonwealth Games, Gold Coast, Queensland, she won the gold medal in the Women's 100m T35.

At the 2020 Tokyo Paralympics, Holt won the silver medal in the Women's 100 m T35 in a personal best time of 13.13. She also won silver in the Women's 200 m T35, setting a new Oceania record with a run of 27.94.

World records

Her philosophy is "My ability is bigger than my disability." She was coached in Melbourne by Nick Wall for 2016 Rio Paralympics and by Paul Pearce in Brisbane for the 2020 Tokyo Paralympics.

In November 2022, Holt announced her retirement to pursue a career in psychology.

Recognition
2015 Victorian Junior Athlete of the Year
 2015 Athletics Australia Female Para-athlete of the Year
 2016 Athletics Australia Female Para-athlete of the Year
 2017 Victorian Disability Sport and Recreation Awards – Deakin University Female Sportsperson of the Year
 2017 Victorian Institute of Sport 2XU Youth Award
 2017 Athletics Australia Female Para-athlete of the Year

References

External links
 
 
 Isis Holt at Australian Athletics Historical Results

2001 births
Athletes (track and field) at the 2016 Summer Paralympics
Athletes (track and field) at the 2020 Summer Paralympics
Athletes (track and field) at the 2018 Commonwealth Games
Australian female sprinters
Commonwealth Games gold medallists for Australia
Commonwealth Games medallists in athletics
Living people
Medalists at the 2016 Summer Paralympics
Medalists at the 2020 Summer Paralympics
Paralympic athletes of Australia
Paralympic bronze medalists for Australia
Paralympic silver medalists for Australia
Track and field athletes with cerebral palsy
World record holders in Paralympic athletics
Paralympic medalists in athletics (track and field)
21st-century Australian women
Athletes from Melbourne
Sportswomen from Victoria (Australia)
People educated at Melbourne Girls Grammar
Sportspeople from Canberra
Sportswomen from the Australian Capital Territory
Victorian Institute of Sport alumni
People from Brunswick, Victoria
Medallists at the 2018 Commonwealth Games